Borqs Technologies Inc., founded in 2007, designs, develops and deploys Internet of Things products and solutions. In addition to developing the first commercial-grade software to support video telephony for Android, Borqs was selected by Qualcomm in 2016 to partner in developing the world's first 4G Android wearable, which includes smartwatches for children and adults, as well as watches designed for fitness. Borqs marked its debut as a public company on August 18, 2017, changing its name to Borqs Technologies, Inc. Listed on The NASDAQ Stock Market, under the trading symbol, BRQS. Borqs has research and development centers in China and India, and presence in the US, Japan and Korea.

History 
Borqs has been a member of the Open Handset Alliance since 2008 and is also a member of the Symbian Foundation. Borqs is notable as the developer of the OPhone, or Open Mobile System (OMS), for China Mobile. The OPhone is a Linux-kernel-based open source software platform that has been used in conjunction with China Mobile's proprietary TD-SCDMA 3G network.

Version 2.0 of the Ophone software has 50,000 registered developers and was launched in late 2009. China Mobile has signed up more than 20 handset vendors to develop phones for the Ophone OS. OPhone accounted for 38% of the TD-SCDMA smartphone market at the end of 2011. It has been speculated in the Chinese media that, in time, the OPhone may break away from Android entirely and establish itself as a fully independent operating system.

Borqs has brought its OPhone software to the US under the name Android+. Borqs provided software under the Android+ branding for Dell's line-up of smartphones in the US.

Milestones

 20072008 Establish R&D centers in Beijing, China and Bengaluru, India
 2007 Partnered with Google Open Handset Alliance (OHA)
 2008 China Mobile, Softbank, Vodafone and Borqs set the formation of Joint Innovation Laboratory (JIL) 
 2011 Established strategic partnership with Intel
 2011 Cooperated with WAC to realize full compatibility with the Web Runtime 1.0 in the Google Android platform 
 2013 Joined Linux Foundation
 2013 Established strategic partnership with Qualcomm 
 2014 Established joint venture with Positivo in Brazil 
 20102014 Established Android mobile services with China Mobile and SingTel Group
 2014 In cooperation with Sonim, Borqs delivered AT&T Push-To-Talk Android phone 
 2015 Provided Android enhancement and product realization for Sprint’s tablet 
 2015 In cooperation with ElaCarte, Borqs developed ruggedized restaurant ordering tablets 
 20112015 Developed 50+ Android devices, 10M+ commercial shipments in 15+ countries
 20152016 Supported Vizio for Smart TV remote control 
 20152016 Provided the In-vehicle Infotainment (IVI) s/w and solutions for Geely
 2016 Supported Reliance for the world's first 4.75G phone 
 2016 Launched Anda’s  Symbol-based Communication Wearable for Children at COMPUTEX 2016
 2016 Partnered with Qualcomm in developing the world's first 4G Android wearable device
 2017 Marked debut as a public company on The NASDAQ Stock Market under the trading symbol, BRQS.
 2017 Exhibited the world's first NB-IoT tracker based on Qualcomm’s wear platform during China Mobile Global Partners Conference
 2018 Signed letter of intent to acquire electric vehicle control company Shanghai KADI Machinery Technology Co., Ltd
 2018 Signed agreement to acquire a major Chinese EMS – Shenzhen Crave Communication
 2022 Under the leadership of Anthony Chan and Pat Chan the stock has lost more than 97% of its value

Investors

 GSR Ventures 
 Intel Capital 
 Keystone Capital  
 Norwest Venture Partners 
 Qualcomm Ventures 
 Pacific Securities Co., Ltd. 
 The SBI & TH Venture Capital 
 SK Telecom China Fund I L.P.

See also
OPhone

References

Software companies of China
Chinese companies established in 2007
Mobile technology companies
Chinese brands